Sarikishti (formerly: 40-Solagii Tojikiston) is a village and jamoat in Tajikistan. It is located in Rudaki District, one of the Districts of Republican Subordination. The jamoat has a total population of 38,474 (2015).

Notes

References

Populated places in Districts of Republican Subordination
Jamoats of Tajikistan